Susan Whitfield (born 1960) is a British scholar, currently Professor in Silk Road Studies at the Sainsbury Institute for the Study of Japanese Arts and Cultures (SISJAC), University of East Anglia. She previously worked at the British Library in London, England. She specialises in the history and archaeology of the Silk Road but has also written on human rights and censorship in China.

Career
Whitfield obtained a PhD in historiography from SOAS, University of London in 1995, with a dissertation entitled Politics against the Pen on the Tang dynasty poet Liu Zongyuan. 

Whitfield was the first director of the International Dunhuang Project, a position which she held for 24 years, from 1993 until July 2017. In this capacity she was involved in research and cataloguing of Central Asian manuscripts at the British Library and elsewhere. She has a particular interest in censorship and forgeries from Dunhuang.  In an interview at the University of Minnesota in 2013, she talks about how she came to her interest in China and Central Asia and ways in which her interest in Central Asia has made her rethink Chinese history, regarding it as rather more fragmented and diverse than unitary narratives might have us believe.

Whitfield holds a position as Honorary Associate Professor at the Institute of Archaeology of University College London.

Books 
 
 
 
 
 
 
 

 Whitfield, Susan (ed.) (2019). Silk Roads. Peoples, Cultures, Landscapes. Thames and Hudson.

References

External links 

 Susan Whitfield talks about the Diamond Sutra in December 2007
 Silk Road Digressions (Whitfield's blog)

1960 births
Alumni of SOAS University of London
Employees of the British Library
English historians
Living people
British sinologists